Thiruvarutchelvar is a 1967 Indian Tamil-language Hindu mythological film, directed and produced by A. P. Nagarajan. The film stars Sivaji Ganesan, Gemini Ganesan, Savitri and Padmini. It was released on 28 July 1967 and ran for 100 days successfully in theatres. This film is also the on-screen debut of Srividya as a child artiste.

Plot 
This movie chronicles the various "adventures" of Lord Shiva where he played with his devotees, especially, the key Nayanmars of Appar, Sundarar, Thirugnanasambandhar, Tiru Kurippu Thondar and Sekkizhar woven into a intricate narration. Taken largely from Periya Puranam, the movie is episodic and includes tales of how Sekkizhar works to compose it as he narrates the tale of how the Lord tested Tiru Kurippu Thondar, stopped the marriage of Sundarar while showing the world the power of verses of Appar and Sambandar by making them open the gates of temples, that had been locked for centuries, through their songs while also guide Appar to revive a dead child through his songs.

Cast 
Sivaji Ganesan as King, Sekkizhar, Tiru Kurippu Thonda Nayanar, Sundaramoorthy Nayanar, Thirunavukarasar (Appar)
Gemini Ganesan as Shiva
Savitri as Arulmozhi
R. Muthuraman as Apputhi Adigal
Padmini as the dancer who corrects and diverts the King into Spiritual world
K. R. Vijaya as Suguna Paravai Nachiyar
Srividya as Sivashakthi Nadanam (credited as Vidhya Moorthy)
Nagesh as Ponnan
Manorama as Ponnan's wife
V. Nagayya
E. R. Sahadevan as Chola king
G. Sakunthala as
Kutty Padmini
K. Sarangapani
P. D. Sambandam
V. Gopalakrishnan as  Kulothunga Chola II (Sekkizhar Head of King)
Senthamarai

Production 
Srividya, who went on to become a popular actress made her debut in this film. Her name was shown as Vidhya Moorthy in the introductory credits. Sivaji Ganesan's performance as Appar was inspired by Kanchi Paramacharya of Kanchi Kamakoti Peetham.

Soundtrack 
The soundtracks were composed by K. V. Mahadevan and lyrics were by Kannadasan. The song "Nadarmudi" is based on Punnagavarali raga. The song "Mannavan Vanthanadi" is based on Kalyani raga. P. Susheela who sang the song recalled that she was initially nervous to sing this song because of Sivaji Ganesan's presence at the studio. Noticing it, Ganesan walked out of the studio and Susheela recorded the song.

References

Bibliography

External links 
 

1960s Tamil-language films
1967 films
Films directed by A. P. Nagarajan
Films scored by K. V. Mahadevan
Films with screenplays by A. P. Nagarajan
Hindu devotional films
Hindu mythological films